In Greek mythology, Calabrus (Ancient Greek: Καλάβρῳ) was a son of Zeus and brother of Taenarus and Geraestus. The three brothers were said to have sailed to Peloponnese and to have seized a portion of land there.

Note

References 

 Stephanus of Byzantium, Stephani Byzantii Ethnicorum quae supersunt, edited by August Meineike (1790-1870), published 1849. A few entries from this important ancient handbook of place names have been translated by Brady Kiesling. Online version at the Topos Text Project.

Children of Zeus